Wisteria floribunda, common name , is a species of flowering plant in the family Fabaceae, native to Japan. (Wisteriopsis japonica, synonym Wisteria japonica, is a different species.) It was first brought from Japan to the United States in the 1830s. Since then, it has become one of the most highly romanticized flowering garden plants. It is also a common subject for bonsai, along with Wisteria sinensis (Chinese wisteria).

The flowering habit of Japanese wisteria is perhaps the most spectacular of the Wisteria genus. It sports the longest flower racemes of any wisteria; Some of those cultivars can reach  in length.
These racemes burst into great trails of clustered white, pink, violet, or blue flowers in early- to mid-spring. The flowers carry a distinctive fragrance similar to that of grapes. The early flowering time of Japanese wisteria can cause problems in temperate climates, where early frosts can destroy the coming years' flowers. It will also flower only after passing from juvenile to adult stage, a transition that may take many years just like its cousin Chinese wisteria.

The foliage consists of shiny, dark-green, pinnately compound leaves  in length. Japanese wisteria prefers moist soils and full sun in USDA plant hardiness zones 5-9. The plant often lives over 50 years.

Cultivars
Those marked  have gained the Royal Horticultural Society's Award of Garden Merit.
 'Burford'  — pale violet with purple keel
 'Domino'  - pale lilac
 ' Perfect' - light lavender flowers
 'Jako' or 'Ivory Tower' 
 'Kimono' 
  <ref>.
 'Macrobotrys' or 'Longissima' - reddish-violet flower clusters  or longer
 'Macrobotrys Cascade' - white and pinkish-purple flowers, vigorous grower
 'Nana Richins Purple' - purple flowers
  - variegated foliage
 'Plena' or 'Violaceae Plena' - double blue flowers in dense clusters
 'Praecox' or 'Domino' - purple flowers
 'Purpurea' - unknown - may be Wisteria sinensis 'Consequa', sometimes labeled purpurea
 'Rubra' - unknown - may be 'Honbeni' - sometimes labeled as Rubrum - deep pink to red flowers
  (W. floribunda f' alba)  - long white flower clusters
 'Texas Purple' - may be a sinensis or a hybrid, short racemes, purple flowers, produced while the plant is still young
 'Violacea Plena' - double violet flowers, rosette-shaped
 'White with Blue Eye' - also known as 'Sekines Blue' - very fragrant

Gallery

References

External links

 Japanese Wisteria at MSU
 Japanese Wisteria as a pest
 University of Ohio fact sheet for Wisteria family

floribunda
Flora of Japan
Garden plants of Asia
Plants used in bonsai
Vines